Andrea Scotti (born 27 August 1931) is an Italian film and television actor.

Background 
Born in Naples, Scotti attended at the Centro Sperimentale di Cinematografia in Rome, graduating in 1956. During his career he was mainly active in genre films, particularly peplum, Spaghetti Western and crime films, He was sometimes credited Andrew Scott.

Selected filmography 

 Captain Falcon (1958)
 Three Strangers in Rome  (1958) 
 Morte di Un Amico  (1959) 
 Attack of the Moors (1959)
 Atom Age Vampire  (1960) 
 The Huns (1960) 
 Don Camillo: Monsignor (1961)
 Taras Bulba, the Cossack (1962)
 Samson and the Slave Queen  (1963) 
 The Sign of the Coyote (1963)
 Hercules and the Tyrants of Babylon  (1964) 
 Hercules and the Treasure of the Incas  (1964) 
 The Beast of Babylon Against the Son of Hercules  (1964) 
 How We Got into Trouble with the Army (1965) 
 Blood for a Silver Dollar  (1965) 
 Captain from Toledo  (1965) 
 Conqueror of Atlantis  (1965) 
 Operation Poker  (1965) 
 Agent 077: Mission Bloody Mary  (1965) 
 In a Colt's Shadow  (1965) 
 Blood for a Silver Dollar  (1965) 
 Buffalo Bill, Hero of the Far West (1965)  
 Password: Kill Agent Gordon  (1966) 
 Special Code: Assignment Lost Formula  (1966)  
 Son of Django (1967) 
 Trusting Is Good... Shooting Is Better  (1968)   
 I Want Him Dead  (1968) 
 Django, Prepare a Coffin  (1968) 
 Pistol for a Hundred Coffins (1968)
 Adiós, Sabata (1970)
 The Price of Death (1971)
 The Fifth Cord (1971)
 Those Dirty Dogs (1973)
 The Killer Reserved Nine Seats (1974)
 Terror Express (1976) 
 Werewolf Woman (1976)
 Fearless (1978)

References

External links
 

1931 births
Living people
Italian male film actors 
Italian male television actors 
Male actors from Naples
Male Spaghetti Western actors
Centro Sperimentale di Cinematografia alumni